Jai Kali Kalkattawali (Bengali: জয় কালী কালকাত্তায়ালি, yāi kālī kālakāttāy.āli) is an Indian Bengali language anthology crime "Chalo Paltai" drama series that premiered on 24 July 2017 starring Ananya Chatterjee and Biswanath Basu. It was produced by Shree Venkatesh Films. It went off-air on 1 June 2019, airing 661 episodes. It was re-aired on Star Jalsha and Star Jalsha HD during lockdown period, due to COVID-19 pandemic.

Plot
Abhaya is a detective who also a devotee of Goddess Kali, and a saviour in disguise for women. Abhaya was brought up by her in-laws when she was just six after her mother's death due to domestic violence and her father was a priest of the Mukherjees and he died after leaving her to her in-laws' place.

The show starts with Abhaya's childhood where Abhaya goes to pray Goddess Kali but she sees her mother facing domestic violence and was murdered and burned in fire, which she saw it as a terrible dream. She suddenly wakes up but the dream of her mother's death constantly reminds her. She is also a devotee of Goddess Kali and a housewife of the Mukherjees. Sometimes, to catch criminals, she disguises herself.

As she confronts the it follows the story of Abhaya, a docile homemaker from a traditional Bengali family who crusades against injustice against women. It shows how she uses her skills to solve crimes and catch criminals while looking after her family.

The show ended with Radharani fixing time bomb in Abhaya's chair, where Abhaya successfully wins, and Radharani dies and at the very end, it was shown Abhaya saying a few words.

Cast

Main 

Ananya Chatterjee as Abhaya Mukherjee aka Mishti - Khokon's wife and Gungun and Topor's mother
Biswanath Basu as Tathagata Mukherjee aka Khokon - Gungun and Topor's father, Abhaya's husband
Aditi Chatterjee as Sarbani Mukherjee aka Buri - Animesh and Bharati's only daughter

Recurring 
Manasi Sinha as Bharati Mukherjee - Bochon, Khokon, Buri and Tojon's mother
Manishankar Banerjee as Animesh Mukherjee - Bochon, Khokon, Buri and Tojon's father
 Mita Chatterjee as Animesh's paternal aunt aka Pishithamma
Basanti Chatterjee as Hema Malini - Bochon, Khokon, Buri and Tojon's paternal grandmother
Rani Mukherjee as Banasali Mukherjee aka Mahua - Animesh and Bharati's eldest daughter-in-law 
Oindrila Saha as Kaushiki Mukherjee aka Phuljhuri - Bochon and Mahua's daughter
Tanish Chakraborty as Topor - Abhaya and Khokon's son
Sandip Chakraborty as Bochon Mukherjee - Animesh and Bharati's eldest son
Sampurna Mondal/Saheli Ghosh Ray as Ishani Mukherjee aka Gungun - Abhaya and Khokon's daughter
Debomoy Mukherjee as Swagato Mukherjee aka Tojon - Animesh and Bharati's youngest son
Bhaswar Chatterjee as Baba Biswalok (later disguised as Priyajit Sarkar, a magician, only to seek revenge from Abhaya)
Annwesha Hazra as Amrita 
Bhaskar Banerjee as Bhaskar Ganguly
Priyanka Bhattacharjee as Shruti, Buri's student
Chandrayee Ghosh as Radharani - A corrupt self-proclaimed godwoman (Deceased)
Mayna Banerjee as Sarada - Abhaya's biological mother (Deceased)
Rii Sen as Damayanti Bose - Film actress (Deceased) 
Tramila Bhattacharya as Mithila, a police officer
Joyjit Banerjee as a fellow Inspector 
Priyanka Halder as Rikhiya, Amaresh's girlfriend
Diya Chakraborty as Upanita and Upasana (double role)
Manali Dey as Manjari
Sarmistha Acharjee as Pooja
Tanuka as Basundhara (Deceased)
 Debachandrima Singha Roy as Ira
Tumpa Ghosh as Tanushree
Nabonita Dey as Riyaa.
Adrija Roy as Diya Singha - Barnali and Durjoy's daughter (Deceased)
Sohini Sanyal as Barnali Singha - Diya's mother, Durjoy's wife
Joy Badlani as Durjoy Singha - Diya's father, Barnali's wife
Nandini Chatterjee as Nivedita Palit - Pooja's mother in-law
Moushumi Priya Debnath as Pia
Sayanta Modak as Korok, Pia's husband
Sreetama Bhattacharya as Sudipa
Geetashree Roy as Rikia
Payel Dey as Ritoja
Pratyusha Paul as Ranja
Sonalee Chaudhuri as Chandni
Aindrila Sharma as Poulomi 
Aishwarya Sen as Paromita
Samrat Mukherji as Animesh
Alivia Sarkar as Linda
Rajesh kr Chattopadhyay as Ajay
Trina Saha as Keya
Ushasi Ray as Muniya
Swarnava Sanyal as Baban
Kanyakumari Mukherjee as Baban's mother
Jasmine Roy as Swati - Sandip's wife and Goutam's love interest
Farhan Imroze  as Sandip - Swati's husband /Fake Sandip or Goutam, Rini's husband and Swati's love interest
Aemila Sadhukan as Rini, Goutam's wife
Soumitrisha Kundu as Raka
Animesh Bhaduri as Sukumar- Sarbani's love interest.

References

External links 
 

Bengali-language television programming in India
Indian drama television series
Star Jalsha original programming
2017 Indian television series debuts
2019 Indian television series endings